Rémi is a Malagasy politician. A member of the National Assembly of Madagascar, he was elected from the Fanjava Velogno party; he represents the constituency of Antsohihy.

References

External links
Profile on National Assembly site

Year of birth missing (living people)
Living people
Members of the National Assembly (Madagascar)
Fanjava Velogno politicians
Place of birth missing (living people)